The Migration Matters Trust is a campaign formed by a cross-party politicians, business executives and trade unionists and set up in 2013.

Their stated aim is to establish "an open and honest debate about the issues of migration" that "acknowledge[s] the positives of migration, while directly confronting the challenges".

The Trust is co-chaired by Labour ex-MP Barbara Roche, Conservative MP Nadhim Zahawi and Liberal Democrat Lord Navnit Dholakia.

The trust is seen generally as a counter weight to the right-leaning Migrationwatch.

Notes

External links
 Official website

2013 establishments in the United Kingdom
Political campaigns in the United Kingdom
Immigration to the United Kingdom
Organizations established in 2013